James David Walker Jr. (August 13, 1921 – December 20, 2012), better known by his stage name Jimmy McCracklin, was an American pianist, vocalist, and songwriter. His style contained West Coast blues, Jump blues, and R&B. Over a career that spanned seven decades, he said he had written almost a thousand songs and had recorded hundreds of them. McCracklin recorded over 30 albums, and earned four gold records. Tom Mazzolini of the San Francisco Blues Festival said of him, "He was probably the most important musician to come out of the Bay Area in the post-World War II years."

Biography
McCracklin was born James David Walker Jr. on August 13, 1921.  Sources differ as to whether he was born in Elaine, Arkansas or St. Louis, Missouri.  He joined the United States Navy in 1938, later settled in Richmond, California, and began playing at the local Club Savoy owned by his sister-in-law Willie Mae "Granny" Johnson. The room-length bar served beer and wine, and Granny Johnson served home-cooked meals of greens, ribs, chicken, and other southern cuisine. A house band composed of Bay Area based musicians alternated with and frequently backed performers such as B. B. King, Charles Brown, and L. C. Robinson. Later in 1963 he would write and record a song "Club Savoy" on his I Just Gotta Know album.

His recorded a debut single for Globe Records, "Miss Mattie Left Me", in 1945, and "Street Loafin' Woman" in 1946. McCracklin recorded for a number of labels in Los Angeles and Oakland, prior to joining Modern Records in 1949-1950. He formed a group called Jimmy McCracklin and his Blues Blasters in 1946, with guitarist Robert Kelton, later replaced by Lafayette Thomas who remained with the group until the early 1960s.

His popularity increased after appearing on American Bandstand in support of his self-written single "The Walk" (1957), subsequently released by Checker Records in 1958. It went to No. 5 on the Billboard R&B chart and No. 7 on the pop chart, after more than 10 years of McCracklin selling records in the black community on a series of small labels. Jimmy McCracklin Sings, his first solo album, was released in 1962, in the West Coast blues style. In 1962, McCracklin recorded "Just Got to Know" for his own Art-Tone label in Oakland; the record made No. 2 on the R&B chart. For a brief period in the early 1970s McCracklin ran the Continental Club in San Francisco. He booked blues acts such as T-Bone Walker, Irma Thomas, Big Joe Turner, Big Mama Thornton, and Etta James. In 1967, Otis Redding and Carla Thomas had success with "Tramp", a song credited to McCracklin and Lowell Fulson. Salt-n-Pepa made a hip-hop hit out of the song in 1987. Oakland Blues (1968) was an album arranged and directed by McCracklin, and produced by World Pacific. The California rock-n-roll "roots music" band The Blasters named themselves after McCracklin's backing band The Blues Blasters. Blasters' lead singer Phil Alvin explained the origin of the band's name: "I thought Joe Turner’s backup band on Atlantic records – I had these 78s – I thought they were the Blues Blasters. It ends up it was Jimmy McCracklin's. I just took the 'Blues' off and Joe finally told me, that’s Jimmy McCracklin’s name, but you tell ‘im I gave you permission to steal it."

McCracklin continued to tour and produce new albums in the 1980s and 1990s. Bob Dylan has cited McCracklin as a favorite. He played at the San Francisco Blues Festival in 1973, 1977, 1980, 1981, 1984 and 2007. He was given a Pioneer Award by the Rhythm and Blues Foundation in 1990, and the Living Legend and Hall of Fame award at the Bay Area Black Music Awards, in 2007. McCracklin continued to write, record, and perform into the 21st century.

He died in San Pablo, California, in the San Francisco Bay Area, on December 20, 2012, after a long illness, aged 91.

Selected discography

Quotation
"I can watch a guy work, listen to how he pronounce his words," said McCracklin, "and I can tell just how to fit that guy with a song".

References

External links

Jimmy McCracklin photo gallery
[  Allmusic]

1921 births
2012 deaths
Musicians from St. Louis
American male singers
Songwriters from Missouri
Imperial Records artists
Modern Records artists
RPM Records (United States) artists
Kent Records artists
Chess Records artists
Ace Records (United States) artists
Custom Records artists
Minit Records artists
West Coast blues musicians
Soul-blues musicians
Musicians from the San Francisco Bay Area
Checker Records artists
Stax Records artists
Songwriters from California
20th-century American pianists
Singers from Missouri
American male pianists
20th-century American male musicians
People from Phillips County, Arkansas
American male songwriters